Banca Pueyo is a traditional Spanish bank founded in 1890 and located in Villanueva de la Serena - Extremadura city, south-west of Spain.

The bank is called Pueyo after the founding family and at the start it was a banking house serving as a regional bank.

In 2015 the bank celebrated 125 years from the foundation, during which it opened 116 offices and today it employs about 276 people and serves to about 120,000 clients.

References

External links 
Homepage
Celebrating 125th anniversary in 2015 (in Spanish)

Banks of Spain
Banks established in 1890
1890 establishments in Spain